Old friends of the Chinese people, or Chinese people's old friends, is a special Chinese diplomatic term used by the Chinese Communist Party and the Chinese government and its main leaders to describe international friends who made contributions to China's construction. From 1949 to 2010, 601 foreigners, from 123 countries on five continents, were referred to as the "old friends" in the People's Daily. Among the first was James Gareth Endicott, a Canadian clergyman who supported the Chinese Communist Revolution.

The number of nationalities of foreign friends described as "old friends of the Chinese people" has increased from 9 in the 1950s and 1960s to 24 in the 1990s, and again to 29 in the 21st century.

With the changes in China's foreign policy, the "old friends of the Chinese people" in different eras also point to different groups. The first batch of "old friends", represented by Edgar Snow and Ma Haide, were foreigners who had visited Yan'an during the Second Sino-Japanese War and assisted the CCP's revolution. The second batch of "old friends", represented by Norodom Sihanouk, were the leaders of the Third World and socialist camp countries who had supported each other internationally after the establishment of the People's Republic of China in 1949. The third batch of "old friends", represented by Henry Kissinger and Richard Nixon, were the private individuals and foreign dignitaries who had contributed to the normalization of China's diplomacy in the 1970s. The fourth batch of "old friends", represented by George H. W. Bush and Jacques Chirac, are those who, after China's "reform and opening up", have helped China to integrate into the world order and stand on the international stage.

See also 
 Hurting the feelings of the Chinese people
 International Liaison Department of the Chinese Communist Party
 State Administration of Foreign Experts Affairs

References

Political catchphrases
Foreign relations of China
1940s neologisms